Schwartzenbach Falls, also known as Qulitasaniakvik, is a tiered horsetail waterfall located in the Weasel River Valley of Baffin Island in Nunavut, Canada.

Name origin
The Inuktitut name for the waterfall is Qulitasaniakvik, which means "place to get caribou skins". The name refers to the valley above the falls being a good place to hunt for caribou.

Structure
The falls form from an unnamed stream that plummets  down the western wall of the Weasel River Valley. The initial drop leaps  over the edge of an inclined cliff and takes the form of a horsetail. This is followed by a series of four smaller cascades that descend an additional  before the cliff gives way to a collection of talus deposits.

See also
List of waterfalls of Canada

References

External links
View of the entirety of Schwartzenbach Falls, August 2016

Waterfalls of Nunavut
Baffin Island